John Constable was an English painter.

John Constable may also refer to:

Politicians

John Constable (Lord Mayor of York) on List of Lord Mayors of York
John Constable (MP died 1550s) for Nottinghamshire
John Constable (of Burton Constable), MP for Hedon

Religious figures
John Constable (Jesuit)
John Constable (priest), Dean of Lincoln

Others
John Constable (writer), playwright, poet, performer and activist
John Constable, 2nd Viscount of Dunbar, Viscount of Dunbar
John Constable (captain), see Action of August 1702